Queen's Park High School is a public, co-ed high school in Balfour Street of Woodstock, Cape Town.

School uniform
The uniform school colours are grey and maroon, which consists of summer and winter uniform:

SUMMER UNIFORM:

Girls- maroon dress, white socks, black school shoes, maroon jersey (if preferred).

Boys- grey shorts or pants; white shirt, with a tie; grey socks; black school shoes; maroon jersey (if preferred)

WINTER UNIFORM:

Girls- grey skirt or pants; black school shoes; white shirt, with a tie; white or grey socks; maroon jersey; maroon blazer (compulsory). Girls can also wear a black pantyhose and a school rain jacket if preferred.

Boys- grey pants; black school shoes; white shirt, with a tie; maroon jersey. Boys can also wear a school rain jacket if preferred.

A maroon school blazer is mandatory to be worn at all times.

Queens Park High School also has Physical Education uniform with can be won by both girls and boys:

Maroon or plain white t-shirt; either maroon, plain white or blue shorts; running shoes of any kind. If a student does not have school shorts other options may be discussed with an educator.

References

External links

Schools in Cape Town